"Problem Child" is a single by English punk rock band the Damned, released on 28 September 1977 by Stiff Records as a preview for the band's second studio album, Music for Pleasure. The tracks were produced by Pink Floyd drummer Nick Mason, and were the first to be released featuring new member Lu Edmunds. The single again failed to chart in the official UK Top 75, though it did reach No. 27 on the NME chart, which used a different sample of record shops.

The single was reissued in Stiff's Damned 4 Pack mail-order set. A CD version was issued in the Stiff Singles 1976-1977 box set  by Castle Music in 2003.

The single was also issued in Germany.

Track listing
 "Problem Child" (Scabies, James) - 2:15
 "You Take My Money" (James)  - 2:00

Production credits
 Producers:
 Nick Mason
 Musicians:
 Dave Vanian − vocals
 Brian James − guitar
 Captain Sensible − bass		
 Rat Scabies − drums
 Lu Edmunds − guitar

References

External links

1977 songs
1977 singles
The Damned (band) songs
Songs written by Brian James (guitarist)
Songs written by Rat Scabies
Song recordings produced by Nick Mason
Stiff Records singles